Jorge Luis Mancillas Ramírez is a Mexican jurist who has been a minister of the Superior Court of Justice of Nuevo Leon since 2004.  In 2005 Mancillas Ramírez was designated President of the Court.

Mancillas has also been professor of law at the Autonomous University of Nuevo León and at the Universidad Regiomontana (UR).

References

20th-century Mexican lawyers
21st-century Mexican judges
Academic staff of the Autonomous University of Nuevo León
Living people
Year of birth missing (living people)